Giorgio Ordelaffi (died 1423) was lord of Forlì and Papal vicar in Romagna (northern Italy). He was a member of the Ordelaffi family.

The son of Teobaldo Ordelaffi, he married Lucrezia Alidosi of the Alidosi family. He kept the seigniory of Forlì from 1411 until his death, moving his residence in the current Palazzo Comunale.

Just before his death, when his son Teobaldo II Ordelaffi was still young, he offered to Filippo Maria Visconti of Milan the occasion to invade Romagna in 1423, initiating the 30-year long Wars in Lombardy.

References

14th-century births
1423 deaths
Giorgio
Lords of Forlì
15th-century Italian nobility